Pope Sergius IV (died 12 May 1012) was the bishop of Rome and nominal ruler of the Papal States from 31 July 1009 to his death. His temporal power was eclipsed by the patrician John Crescentius. Sergius IV may have called for the expulsion of Muslims from the Holy Land, but this is disputed. Since his time, the practice that the person who has been elected to the office pope takes on a new name became tradition.

Early life
Pietro Martino Buccaporci was born in Rome in the "Pina" district, at an unknown date, the son of Peter the Shoemaker and Stephania. He was called Pietro Martino Buccaporci, which was neither his birth name, nor the name of his family, but apparently a nickname given him because of his personal habits.

In 1004, he became the bishop of Albano. He was elected pope after the abdication of John XVIII in 1009, and adopted the name Sergius IV.

Pontificate
The power held by Sergius IV was small and often overshadowed by the patricius, John Crescentius, the ruler of the city of Rome at the time. With the help of Crescentius, Sergius resisted the attempts of Emperor Otto III to establish control over Rome. Sergius IV acted to relieve famine in the city, and he exempted several monasteries from episcopal rule.

A papal bull calling for Muslims to be driven from the Holy Land after the Church of the Holy Sepulchre was destroyed in 1009 by the Fatimid caliph al-Hakim bi-Amr Allah has been attributed to Sergius IV, although its authenticity has long been a matter of debate. Carl Erdmann considered it genuine, but it was rejected at length by Aleksander Gieysztor, who suggested that it was actually invented around the time of the First Crusade in order to help justify that expedition to Jerusalem. Subsequently, Hans Martin Schaller has argued for the document's authenticity.

Death and legacy
Sergius died on 12 May 1012 and was buried in the Basilica of St. John Lateran. Although not canonized, Sergius is sometimes venerated as a saint by the Benedictines of which he was a member. There was some suspicion that he was murdered, as he died within a week of Crescentius, considered by many to have been his patron. Sergius was followed in the papacy by Benedict VIII.

References

Sources

Popes
Italian popes
Cardinal-bishops of Albano
11th-century archbishops
1012 deaths
Year of birth unknown
11th-century popes
Burials at the Archbasilica of Saint John Lateran